Hwang Dong-hyuk (Hanja: 黃東赫; born May 26, 1971) is a South Korean film director, producer and screenwriter. He is best known for directing the 2011 crime drama film Silenced, and for creating the 2021 Netflix survival drama series Squid Game.  Time named him one of the  100 most influential people in the world in 2022.

Early life 
Hwang Dong-hyuk was born and raised in Seoul, South Korea; he immersed himself in manhwa and manga, spending hours in comic book cafes.

Career

2000-2010: Short films and My Father

After he graduated from Seoul National University with a B.A. in Communications, he wrote and directed numerous short films including Our Sad Life and A Puff of Smoke. Moving to Los Angeles to study for a M.F.A. in Film Production at the University of Southern California, he continued to make films, completing two shorts Heaven & Hell and Desperation (2000). His graduation thesis film was Miracle Mile (2004), a short starring Karl Yune as a Korean-American illegal taxi driver who helps his fare, a young Korean woman (played by Hana Kim) search for her brother who was adopted by Americans 20 years ago. Miracle Mile screened at over 40 international film festivals and won several awards, including the DGA Student Film Award and Student Emmy Award.

For his feature film debut, Hwang returned to the topic of adoption in My Father (2007). Based on the true story of Korean-American adoptee Aaron Bates, the film is about a U.S. Army soldier stationed in Korea who appears on national television to search for his birth parents, then finds his father on death row for murder. Kim Yeong-cheol played the father opposite lead actor Daniel Henney, whom Hwang decided to cast despite the latter being typecast as a heartthrob. Henney and Kim were praised for their acting, as was Hwang for his non-melodramatic handling of forgiveness and acceptance, intertwined with issues of cultural identity and the death penalty.

2011-2020: Commercial success with The Crucible (Silenced), Miss Granny and The Fortress

Hwang's second film became one of the biggest stories in Korean cinema in 2011. Based on a novel by Gong Ji-young and starring Gong Yoo and Jung Yu-mi, The Crucible (also known as Silenced) depicts real-life events at the Gwangju Inhwa School for the deaf where young students were cruelly treated and sexually abused by their teachers and administrators. Hwang said he deliberated for about a month whether or not he should make the film, but decided to do it because "It had to be told." Hwang said, "I thought about two things when making this film. First, I wanted to let the world know about this horrific incident. Secondly, I wanted to expose the structural problems of society as revealed during the process of how the case was buried. The issues portrayed in the movie -- sexual violence against children, corrupt ties between police and influential families, negligence of duty by civil servants -- is not fictitious, but can be seen regularly on the daily news." The movie became a box-office hit in Korea, attracting 4.7 million viewers. But more significantly, it provoked widespread public anger and commentary, such that the case was reopened and lawmakers passed the "Dogani Bill" which abolishes the statute of limitations for sex crimes against minors and the disabled. Hwang said, "I took up filmmaking because I was so frustrated by all these unresolved social issues I saw. We can see through films how much we are changed by the world. You can't change society with just one movie, but looking at the repercussion of the release of this film, we can think about the power film has in terms of positively affecting society."

In a significant departure from his previous films, Hwang's third feature Miss Granny (titled Suspicious Girl in Korean) focuses on a 74-year-old woman who regains the appearance of her 20-year-old self (played by Na Moon-hee and Shim Eun-kyung, respectively), in a movie that straddles comedy, family drama, music and romance. Hwang said at the 2014 film's press conference, "With My Father and Silenced, I always seemed to be making social films with dark subject matter, but in reality, I am a fun person. This time I really wanted to make a happy and light film." Strong word of mouth propelled Miss Granny to the top of the box office chart, with more than 8.65 million admissions.

Based on Kim Hoon's novel Namhansanseong (the Korean title for the movie as well), The Fortress stars Lee Byung-hun and Kim Yoon-seok as rival advisors to King Injo at a critical moment during the Second Manchu invasion of Korea. A subtle tour de force in a totally different genre from Hwang's previous movies, it claimed both a popular and critical success with 3.8 million tickets sold in Korea, a distribution to 28 countries, and many awards across Asia.

2021-present: International acclaim with Squid Game 

Hwang had conceived of the idea for Squid Game based on his own economic struggles early in life as well as the class disparity found within South Korea. Though initially scripted in 2008, Hwang was unable to find a production studio to find support for the script until around 2019, when Netflix invested in it as part of their drive to expand their foreign programming offerings. Released on September 17, 2021, it became the most-watched series launch in Netflix history. The stress of creating the series caused him to lose six of his teeth. Due to Squid Game success, Netflix brought Hwang's previous films Silenced, Miss Granny, and The Fortress to the service in the United States and other countries. Hwang won an Emmy for Outstanding Directing for a Drama Series in 2022 for directing the Squid Game episode "Red Light, Green Light", making him the first South Korean to win an Emmy in that category. Hwang received the Geumgwan Order of Cultural Merit from President Yoon Suk-yeol, which is the highest decoration awarded to those who have contributed to culture and arts.

Filmography

Awards and nominations

Listicles

State honors

Notes

References

External links
 
 
 

South Korean film directors
South Korean screenwriters
Seoul National University alumni
USC School of Cinematic Arts alumni
1971 births
Living people
Squid Game
Primetime Emmy Award winners